Melissa Wintrow is an American politician serving as a member of the Idaho Senate from the 19th district. Elected in November 2020, she assumed office on December 1, 2020. Wintrow was previously a member of the Idaho House of Representatives from 2014 to 2020. She is a Democrat.

Early life and education 
Born Troy, Ohio, Wintrow earned a Bachelor of Arts in English literature from Miami University in 1988. She then earned a Master of Education in higher education from the University of Georgia in 1990.

Career 
Wintrow was the first director of the Boise State Women's Center, where she produced The Vagina Monologues. She  was the assistant director for residence education at Boise State University when she resigned to assume her position in the Idaho House of Representatives.

References

External links
Official page at the Idaho Legislature
Campaign site
 

21st-century American politicians
21st-century American women politicians
Democratic Party members of the Idaho House of Representatives
Living people
Miami University alumni
People from Boise, Idaho
People from Latah County, Idaho
University of Georgia alumni
Women state legislators in Idaho
Year of birth missing (living people)